No Time for Goodbye is a thriller novel written by the Canadian author Linwood Barclay. The book was featured on the Richard & Judy summer reading list in 2008 and The Sunday Times reported in its 2008 year-end bestseller list that the novel led the paperback and hardcover fiction list with sales of 636,105 copies.

Summary
The novel starts with 14-year-old Cynthia Bigge waking up one morning in May 1983, to find her father Clayton, her mother Patricia and her brother Todd have all mysteriously disappeared from their home. The previous evening she had had a fight with her parents after secretly meeting with a boy, Vince.

After her parents and brother's disappearance, Cynthia is adopted by her aunt, Tess Berman. She later marries Terry Archer and they have a daughter Grace. Twenty-five years after her family's disappearance, a revelation by Cynthia's aunt and some strange events in and around their home lead Cynthia and Terry to discover what happened 25 years earlier.

Critical reception
The novel received mainly positive reviews. Emma-Lee Potter of The Daily Express called the novel "a fast-moving roller-coaster of a read" and Laura Wilson of The Guardian wrote, "Barclay succeeds in both banging the gong and serving up a riveting, rewarding and, for the most part, plausible three courses, though you may need to take a deep breath somewhere around the coffee stage."

References

Novels by Linwood Barclay
2007 Canadian novels